Murchison Falls National Park (MFNP) is a national park in Uganda managed by the Ugandan Wildlife Authority. It is in north-western Uganda, spreading inland from the shores of Lake Albert, around the Victoria Nile, up to the Karuma Falls.

Together with the adjacent  Bugungu Wildlife Reserve and the  Karuma Wildlife Reserve, the park forms the Murchison Falls Conservation Area (MFCA). As of 2022, the East African Crude Oil Pipeline being built includes the construction of 10 oil well pads, a feeder pipeline, and a refinery in and around the Murchison Falls national park.

Location
The park straddles the Ugandan districts of  Buliisa, Nwoya, Kiryandongo, and Masindi. The coordinates of the park near the Kibanda area are 02°11'15.0"N, 31°46'53.0"E (Latitude:2.187499; Longitude:31.781400).

History 
The explorers John Speke and James Grant were the first Europeans to visit the present day MFCA in 1862. It was more thoroughly explored by Samuel and Florence Baker in 1863–4. Baker named the falls Murchison Falls after the geologist Roderick Murchison, then the president of the Royal Geographical Society.

In 1910, the Bunyoro Game Reserve was created south of the River Nile. That area roughly corresponds to the part of the MFNP that is in the districts of Buliisa, Masindi, and Kiryandongo. In 1928, the boundaries were extended north of the river into the modern-day Nwoya District.

In 1952, the British administration established the National Parks Act of Uganda. The area described above became Murchison Falls National Park.

Overview

MFNP is Uganda's largest national park.

Also in the park, adjacent to the Masindi-Gulu Highway, are the Karuma Falls, the location of the 600 megawatt Karuma Power Station, which will be Uganda's largest power station when it comes online circa 2022.

As of 2022, the East African Crude Oil Pipeline being built includes the construction of 10 oil well pads, a feeder pipeline, and a refinery in and around the Murchison Falls national park.

Wildlife
MFCA and the adjacent Bugondo Forest Reserve have 76 species of mammals as well as Uganda's largest population of Nile crocodiles. There are 450 known bird species in the park, including the rare shoe-billed stork, dwarf kingfisher, Goliath heron, white-thighed hornbill and great blue turaco.

Since 2005, the protected area is considered a Lion Conservation Unit. In 2010, it was estimated that only 250 giraffes were in the park. A population of 37 Rothschild's giraffes was transferred from the north side of the Nile River to the south side in 2016 and 2017, when population was around 1,500.

Tourism 
Murchison Falls National Park is Uganda’s most popular national park, receiving the highest annual number of visitors of any park in the country. Popular visitor activities include game drives, night drives, boat cruises to the delta and Murchison Falls waterfall, nature walks, bird watching and chimp tracking. Tourists visiting Murchison Falls National Park make a 5 hours 40 minutes drive from Kampala to reach the park. The park is also connected by daily domestic flights from Entebbe International Airport, to Kidepo Valley National Park and Queen Elizabeth National Park, which land at Pakuba Airstrip and Bugungu Airstrip. The park offers a range of tented camps and safari lodges to accommodate visitors.

See also

 List of national parks of Uganda

References

External links

 Overview at Uganda Wildlife Authority

National parks of Uganda
Buliisa District
Kiryandongo District
Masindi District
Nwoya District
Protected areas established in 1952
Important Bird Areas of Uganda
Ramsar sites in Uganda
1952 establishments in Uganda
Victoria Basin forest–savanna mosaic